The Unseen is the debut studio album by Quasimoto, a hip-hop duo composed of Madlib and his animated alter ego Lord Quas. It was released under Stones Throw Records on June 13, 2000. It was re-released in 2005 as a deluxe edition with a bonus CD containing the instrumental version of the album.

Madlib took mushrooms for a month while creating the album. It was co-mixed by Kut Masta Kurt and Peanut Butter Wolf. The cover was designed by Jeff Jank. The song "Low Class Conspiracy" was on the soundtrack for the video game Tony Hawk's Underground.

Critical reception

Nathan Rabin of The A.V. Club said, "The Unseen represents a dramatic leap forward for Madlib as a producer, as he integrates left-field, found-sound samples with dexterity and wit that brings to mind Prince Paul's consistently surprising production work." Meanwhile, Michaelangelo Matos of City Pages said, "The Unseen bursts with so much found material it's tempting to think Madlib changed his name to escape litigation, pilfering everything from Augustus Pablo to Melvin Van Peebles to enough jazz artists to fill a West Village loft".

Steve Huey of AllMusic called it "one of the most imaginative albums of the new West Coast underground, a puzzling, psychedelic jazz-rap gem riddled with warped humor and fractured musical genius."

The Unseen ranked at number 17 on Spins list of the best albums of 2000. Rhapsody ranked it at number seven on its "Hip-Hop's Best Albums of the Decade" list. In 2015, it ranked at number 29 on Facts "100 Best Indie Hip-Hop Records of All Time" list. In that year, it was also listed by HipHopDX as one of the "30 Best Underground Hip Hop Albums Since 2000".

Track listing
All tracks produced by Madlib

References

External links
 

Madlib albums
2000 debut albums
Stones Throw Records albums
Albums produced by Madlib